The Crawlerway is a   double pathway at the Kennedy Space Center in Florida. It runs between the Vehicle Assembly Building and the two launch pads at Launch Complex 39. A  bed of stones lies beneath a layer of asphalt and a surface made of Tennessee river rocks.

The Crawlerway was originally designed to support the weight of the Saturn V rocket and its payload, plus the Launch Umbilical Tower and mobile launcher platform, atop a crawler-transporter during the Apollo program. It was also used from 1981 to 2011 to transport the lighter Space Shuttles to their launch pads.

Construction of the Crawlerway connected Merritt Island with the mainland, forming a peninsula. The main vehicle access road to and from the launch pads, the Saturn Causeway, runs alongside the Crawlerway.

Construction
The Crawlerway is composed of two  lanes, separated by a  median. Tennessee river rock was chosen for many properties, including hardness, roundness, sphericity and LA abrasion test score. By 2013, a project to repair and upgrade the Crawlerway was undertaken, the first time since it was constructed that the foundation had been repaired. Additional rock was added to the surface in June 2014.

Gallery

References

External links

Kennedy Space Center
Apollo program
Space Shuttle program
Buildings and structures in Merritt Island, Florida
National Register of Historic Places in Brevard County, Florida
1964 establishments in Florida